Henrino Makaya is a Congolese professional footballer who last played as a midfielder for AS Cheminots.

International career
In January 2014, coach Claude Leroy, invited him to be a part of the Congo squad for the 2014 African Nations Championship. The team was eliminated in the group stages after losing to Ghana, drawing with Libya and defeating Ethiopia.

References

Living people
Republic of the Congo footballers
Republic of the Congo international footballers
2014 African Nations Championship players
AS Cheminots players
1993 births
CSMD Diables Noirs players
Association football midfielders
Republic of the Congo A' international footballers